Thomas Mountain, Thomas Mountains, or Mount Thomas, may refer to;

Thomas Mountain(s)
 Thomas Mountain (California), a peak in the San Jacinto Mountains, Riverside County, California
 Little Thomas Mountain, a secondary peak in the San Jacinto Mountains, Riverside County, California
 Thomas Mountain, California, an unincorporated community in Riverside County
 Thomas Mountain Summit, a peak in Fairfield County, Connecticut
 Thomas Mountains, a mountain range in Palmer Land, Antarctica

Mount Thomas
 Mount Thomas, a fictional town in Australian television drama Blue Heelers
 Mount Thomas (Alaska), a mountain in the Chugach Mountains, Alaska
 Mount Thomas (Antarctica), a mountain in the Prince Charles Mountains

People
 Thomas Mountain, winner of the 1978 Charles Ives Prize